The Council for Hospitality Management Education, is a learned society in the United Kingdom that represents UK, European and International universities and colleges offering higher education programmes in the fields of  hospitality studies, hospitality management, and related fields. It is a member of the Academy of Social Sciences.

External links

References

Hospitality industry in the United Kingdom
Learned societies of the United Kingdom
Scientific organisations based in the United Kingdom
Academic organisations based in the United Kingdom